Carmen Essam Soliman (born on 7 October 1994), better known by her stage name Carmen Suleiman, is an Egyptian singer. Soliman won the first season of Arab Idol song contest in 2012 broadcast live on MBC 1, winning a recording contract with Platinum Records.
After grueling rounds of televised eliminations, and critical evaluations by celebrity judges Ragheb Alama, Nancy Ajram, Ahlam and Egyptian music producer Hassan El Shafei, Carmen Soliman prevailed against all other contestants to become the first winner of the hit series on 24 March 2012 with the highest number of votes.
Her first single, "Kalam Kalam" was released on 4 March 2013 jumping to No. 1 on the Egyptian charts, and her first album was released in January 2014. Carmen followed with numerous hit singles, including "Akhbari" and "Azama Ala Azama" a trio with fellow Idol contestants, Dounia Batma and Youssef Arafat.

Carmen released her first single "Kalam Kalam" on 4 March 2013, and did the singing voice of Moana in the Arabic dub.

Performances in Arab Idol 
 First casting (Cairo) : "Magadir" by Talal Maddah
 Second casting (Beirut) : "Yana Yana" by Sabah
Top 10 Girls : "Meen Da Elli Nseek" by [*Nancy Ajram*]
 1st Prime : "Ana Fintizarak" by Umm Kulthum
 2nd Prime : "Abaad Kontom" by Mohammed Abdu
 3rd Prime : "Zay El Assal" by Sabah
 4th Prime : "Mathasibneesh" by Sherine
 5th Prime : "Seedi Wesalak" by Angham
 5th Prime : "Ya Rub" by Marwan Khoury and Carole Samaha
 6th Prime : "Mostaheel" by Warda Al-Jazairia
 6th Prime : "La Tebki Ya Worood El Dar" by Najwa Karam
 7th Prime : "Ya Mounyati" by Abdel Mohsen El-Mohanna
 7th Prime : "Adwaa El Shohra" by Carole Samaha
 8th Prime : "Ana Albi Dalili" by Laila Mourad
 8th Prime : "Ma Yhimmak" by Yara
 8th Prime : "Alhin Ahebak" by Thekra
 9th Prime : "Bala Hob" by Rouwaida Attieh
 Final : "Wallah Oyonak" by Samira Said
 Final : "Enta Omri" by Umm Kulthum
 Final : "El Rasayel" by Mohamed Abdu
 Final: :"Helwa Ya Baladi" – Dalida

Medleys in Saturdays' results Show
 1st Prime's Results : "Bebasata" by Saber Rebaï
 2nd Prime's Results : "Sabri Aleel" by Sherine
 3rd Prime's Results : "El Hawa Tayer" by Assi El Helani
 4th Prime's Results : "Ana Bdeera" by Majid al-Muhandis
 5th Prime's Results : "Sho Akhbarak" by Nawal Al Zoghbi
 6th Prime's Results : "Abali Habibi" by Elissa
 7th Prime's Results : "Ala Rasi" by Kadhim Al-Sahir
 8th Prime Results : "Ebn El Geeran" and "Mashi Haddi" by Nancy Ajram
 8th Prime Results : "Sit El Habayeb" by Fayza Ahmed

External links 
 
 Page on MBC
 

1994 births
Living people
21st-century Egyptian women singers
Egyptian singers
Egyptian Muslims
Singers who perform in Egyptian Arabic
Contestants from Arabic singing competitions
People from Zagazig